The 1970–71 IHL season was the 26th season of the International Hockey League, a North American minor professional league. Seven teams participated in the regular season, and the Port Huron Flags won the Turner Cup.

Regular season

Turner Cup-Playoffs

Quarterfinals
 Port Huron Flags - Muskegon Mohawks 4:2 on series
 Des Moines Oak Leafs - Fort Wayne Komets 4:1 on series
 Dayton Gems - Flint Generals 4:3 on series

Semifinals 
The semifinals were a round-robin with the Port Huron Flags, Des Moines Oak Leafs, and the Dayton Gems competing. The Flags and Oak Leafs advanced to the finals.

Des Moines - Dayton 4:2
Port Huron - Des Moines 6:3
Dayton - Port Huron 9:5
Des Moines - Dayton 5:1

Final 
 Port Huron Flags - Des Moines Oak Leafs 4:2 on series

External links
 Season 1970/71 on hockeydb.com

IHL
International Hockey League (1945–2001) seasons